Andregamasus is a genus of mites in the family Podocinidae. There are at least three described species in Andregamasus.

Species
These three species belong to the genus Andregamasus:
 Andregamasus branchiophilus Costa, 1972
 Andregamasus conchylicola Andre, 1937
 Andregamasus steinitzii Costa, 1965

References

Mesostigmata
Articles created by Qbugbot